Sumeida's Song is an opera in three scenes by Mohammed Fairouz adapted from the play Song of Death by Egyptian playwright Tawfiq al-Hakim. It is Fairouz's first opera, completed in 2008 when he was 22 years old.

Performance history
The first staged production of the opera opened the 2013 Prototype: Opera/Theater/Now festival in New York City and was billed as "the first Arab-American opera to be fully produced on an American stage." The opera was co-produced by Beth Morrison Projects and Here Arts Center.

Sumeida's Song received concert performances at Carnegie Hall and the New York Society for Ethical Culture before its first staging.

Roles

Synopsis
The three scenes of Sumeida's Song are set in a peasant house in a peasant village in Upper Egypt.

Recording
A recording of Sumeida's Song was released on Bridge Records on October 29, 2012.

Reception
Reviewing the first staged performance for The New York Times, Anthony Tommasini described Sumeida's Song as "an intensely dramatic 60-minute four-character opera with a searing score that deftly draws from Arabic and Western contemporary musical sources.". He went on to note that "Mr. Fairouz’s multilayered music catches the complexities and crosscurrents of this family and the grim realities of their lives" and described Fairouz as having "hints of various Western contemporary idioms in his musical language: American neo-Romanticism; stretches of near-atonality that evoke Berg; astringent washes of sounds that seem inspired by Ligeti, who was one of Mr. Fairouz’s teachers. Yet the Arabic elements of his style — microtonal modes, spiraling dance rhythms, plaintive melodic writing — give fresh, distinctive jolts to the Western elements."

On disc, Sumeida's Song was noted by WQXR-FM as "a lushly scored chamber opera, (completed when Fairouz) was only 22. Its concerns with peace and communal healing place it in the humane tradition of such works as Verdi’s Simon Boccanegra and Don Carlos."

Notes

External links
 PROTOTYPE Festival Page for Sumeida's Song
 Beth Morrison Projects: Current Projects
 Page for Sumeida's Song at the composer's official website

English-language operas
2008 operas
Operas
Operas set in Egypt
Operas based on plays
One-act operas
Compositions by Mohammed Fairouz
Opera world premieres at the Prototype Festival